In mathematics, especially in the area of algebra known as ring theory, an Ore extension, named after Øystein Ore, is a special type of a ring extension whose properties are relatively well understood. Elements of a Ore extension are called Ore polynomials. 

Ore extensions appear in several natural contexts, including skew and differential polynomial rings, group algebras of polycyclic groups, universal enveloping algebras of solvable Lie algebras, and coordinate rings of quantum groups.

Definition 

 .

Then the Ore extension , also called a skew polynomial ring, is the noncommutative ring obtained by giving the ring of polynomials  a new multiplication, subject to the identity

 .

If δ = 0 (i.e., is the zero map) then the Ore extension is denoted R[x; σ]. If σ = 1 (i.e., the identity map) then the Ore extension is denoted R[&hairsp;x, δ ] and is called a differential polynomial ring.

Examples 

The Weyl algebras are Ore extensions, with R any commutative polynomial ring, σ the identity ring endomorphism, and δ the polynomial derivative.  Ore algebras are a class of iterated Ore extensions under suitable constraints that permit to develop a noncommutative extension of the theory of Gröbner bases.

Properties 

 An Ore extension of a domain is a domain.
 An Ore extension of a skew field is a non-commutative principal ideal domain.
 If σ is an automorphism and R is a left Noetherian ring then the Ore extension R[&hairsp;λ; σ, δ ] is also left Noetherian.

Elements 

An element f of an Ore ring R is called
 twosided  (or invariant ), if R·f = f·R, and
 central, if g·f = f·g for all g in R.

Further reading 
 
 
 Azeddine Ouarit (1992) Extensions de ore d'anneaux noetheriens á i.p, Comm. Algebra, 20 No 6,1819-1837. https://zbmath.org/?q=an:0754.16014
 Azeddine Ouarit (1994) A remark on the Jacobson property of PI Ore extensions. (Une remarque sur la propriété de Jacobson des extensions de Ore a I.P.) (French) Zbl 0819.16024. Arch. Math. 63, No.2, 136-139 (1994). https://zbmath.org/?q=an:00687054

References 

Ring theory